Kráľov Brod is a village and municipality in Galanta District of the Trnava Region of south-west Slovakia.

Geography
It has a population of about 1,167 people.

History
In the 9th century, the territory of Kráľov Brod became part of the Kingdom of Hungary. In historical records the village was first mentioned in 1785. After the Austro-Hungarian army disintegrated in November 1918, Czechoslovak troops occupied the area, later acknowledged internationally by the Treaty of Trianon. Between 1938 and 1945 Kráľov Brod once more became part of Miklós Horthy's Hungary through the First Vienna Award. From 1945 until the Velvet Divorce, it was part of Czechoslovakia. Since then it has been part of Slovakia.

Genealogical resources
The records for genealogical research are available at the state archive "Statny Archiv in Bratislava, Slovakia"
 Roman Catholic church records (births/marriages/deaths): 1728-1895 (parish A)

See also
 List of municipalities and towns in Slovakia

References

External links
https://web.archive.org/web/20080111223415/http://www.statistics.sk/mosmis/eng/run.html 
 Surnames of living people in Kralov Brod

Villages and municipalities in Galanta District